Lieutenant General Christiaan Ludolph de Wet du Toit,  (23 September 190114 August 1982) was a South African military commander.

Military career
Du Toit joined the South African Army as an  artilleryman in 1924. He completed the British Army Specialist Staff Course in 1936.

During the Second World War, he commanded Divisional artillery in East Africa and North Africa, before commanding the 2nd South African Infantry Brigade in 1942 and the 1st South African Armoured Brigade from 1943 to 1945. For his service, Du Toit was awarded the Distinguished Service Order and Mentioned in Despatches.

Du Toit served as Director-General of Land Forces, the head of the South African Army, from 1948 to 1950, and as Chief of the General Staff of the Union Defence Force, from 1950 to 1956.

References

|-

|-

1901 births
Afrikaner people
1982 deaths
Chiefs of the South African Army
Companions of the Distinguished Service Order
South African military personnel of World War II